Crocidosema is a genus of tortrix moths (family Tortricidae) belonging to the tribe Eucosmini of subfamily Olethreutinae. They are found mostly in the Southern Hemisphere, being especially common in the Neotropics. But some occur elsewhere, such as on the Hawaiian Islands.

At least some of them can be recognized by their wing veins. In the hindwings, vein 3 and 4 originate from a common stalk, and are approached by the fifth vein at its end. In the forewings, veins 4-6 converge at the termen.

These moths are mostly small and inconspicuous. But C. plebejana is an occasional pest of cotton (and some other mostly malvaceous plants) and has become widely distributed by trade in agricultural produce, while the lantana flower-cluster moth (C. lantana) is employed in Lantana biocontrol and has been deliberately introduced to some locations.

Species
As of 2010, the 29 described species of Crocidosema are:

 Crocidosema accessa (Heinrich, 1931)
 Crocidosema apicinota (Turner, 1946)
 Crocidosema aporema (Walsingham, 1914)
 Crocidosema callida Meyrick, 1917
 Crocidosema calvifrons (Walsingham, 1891)
 Crocidosema cecidogena (Kieffer, 1908)
 Crocidosema compsoptila Meyrick, 1936
 Crocidosema cosmoptila Meyrick, 1917
 Crocidosema evidens (Meyrick, 1917)
 Crocidosema impendens Meyrick, 1917
 Crocidosema insulana Aurivillius, 1922
 Crocidosema lantana Busck, 1910 – lantana flower-cluster moth, lantana tortricid moth
 Crocidosema leprarum Walsingham in Sharp, 1907
 Crocidosema leptozona (Meyrick, 1921)
 Crocidosema longipalpana (Moschler, 1891)
 Crocidosema nitsugai Vargas, 2019 
 Crocidosema marcidellum Walsingham in Sharp, 1907
 Crocidosema meridospila (Meyrick, 1922)
 Crocidosema orfilai Pastrana, 1964
 Crocidosema perplexana (Fernald, 1901)
 Crocidosema plebejana Zeller, 1847
 Crocidosema pollutana (Zeller, 1877)
 Crocidosema pristinana (Zeller, 1877)
 Crocidosema pyrrhulana (Zeller, 1877)
 Crocidosema roraria Meyrick, 1917
 Crocidosema sediliata (Meyrick, 1912)
 Crocidosema thematica (Meyrick, 1918)
 Crocidosema unica (Heinrich, 1923)
 Crocidosema venata Razowski & Wojtusiak, 2006
 Crocidosema veternana (Zeller, 1877)

(incomplete list)

Footnotes

References
  (2010a): Online World Catalogue of the Tortricidae – Genus Crocidosema account. Version 2.0. Retrieved 2011-OCT-15.
  (2010b): Online World Catalogue of the Tortricidae – Crocidosema species list. Version 2.0. Retrieved 2011-OCT-15.
  (1986): Pyralidae and Microlepidoptera of the Marquesas Archipelago. Smithsonian Contributions to Zoology 416: 1-485. PDF fulltext (214 MB!)
  (2004): Butterflies and Moths of the World, Generic Names and their Type-species – Crocidosema. Version of 2004-NOV-05. Retrieved 2011-OCT-15.

Eucosmini
Tortricidae genera
Taxa named by Philipp Christoph Zeller